Nicholas Andrew Cowell (born 7 March 1961) is a British property developer/investor, co-founder of Estate Office Property Consultants (a business he later sold) and head of the Cowell Group. He is the brother of Simon Cowell and half-brother of author Tony Cowell.

Life and career
The brothers grew up in Elstree in Hertfordshire, next door to Joan Collins.

In the late 1970s he began work as an estate agency office junior at Garrard Smith & Partners and subsequently bought the company in 1983 with his business partner Adrian Levy. It was later renamed Estate Office Property Consultants, the business was sold many years later in order to focus on the Cowell Group as principal investors. In 2005 he helped launched a £400m property fund in cooperation with property syndicator aAIM attracting investors like Elton John and Rod Stewart. 

He also has invested in various other ventures outside of the property world including The Bike Shed Motorcycle Club which is a private members club with branches in London and Los Angeles.

Nicholas lives in London with his wife and two children.

References

External links
 

Living people
1961 births
British people of Polish-Jewish descent
British music industry executives
British real estate businesspeople